The 1951–52 Liga Bet season saw Hapoel Balfouria (champions of the North Division) and Hapoel Kfar Saba (champions of the South Division) promoted to Liga Alef. Hapoel Kfar Ata of the North Division, Maccabi Nes Tziona and Hapoel HaNamal Jaffa of the South Division were all relegated. Hapoel HaNamal Haifa relegated following suspension, whilst Beitar Netanya and Hapoel Zikhron Ya'akov both withdrew from the league during season. thus, also relegated to Liga Gimel.

Participating teams
All active teams that have played in the aborted 1947–48 Liga Bet were invited to join the league. 11 teams from the North Division (Hapoel Balfouria, Hapoel Hadera, Hakoah Haifa, Hapoel Netanya, Hapoel Kiryat Haim, Maccabi Zikhron Ya'akov, Degel Yehuda Haifa, S.C. Atlit, Maccabi Hadera, Hapoel Dror Haifa and Hapoel Kfar Ata) and 8 teams from the South Division (Hapoel Kfar Saba, Maccabi Ramat Gan, Hakoah Tel Aviv, Hapoel Jerusalem, Hapoel Rehovot, Beitar Jerusalem, Hapoel Ra'anana and Hapoel Herzliya) have done so. Maccabi Nes Tziona, who finished bottom of the 1949–50 Israeli League was placed in the South Division.

To fill in the vacancies, one club from the Liga Meuhedet Samaria Division (Hapoel HaNamal Haifa, who finished second in the division) was placed in the North Division to complete a 12-team line-up, and three teams from Liga Meuhedet Tel Aviv Division (Bnei Yehuda, Hapoel Jaffa and Maccabi Jaffa, who finished first, second and third in the division) and two from Jerusalem-South division (Maccabi Sha'arayim and Maccabi Jerusalem, who finished 3rd and 4th in the division) were placed in the South division to complete a 14-team line-up.

North Division

South Division

References
1951-52 Bnei Yehuda 
Previous seasons The Israel Football Association 

Liga Bet seasons
Israel
2